Erupa ruptilineella is a moth in the family Crambidae. It was described by George Hampson in 1896. It is found in Xalapa, Mexico.

References

Erupini
Moths described in 1896